During World War II, the United States Army Air Forces (USAAF) established numerous airfields in New Jersey for training pilots and aircrews of USAAF fighters and bombers.

Most of these airfields were under the command of First Air Force or the Army Air Forces Training Command (AAFTC) (A predecessor of the current-day United States Air Force Air Education and Training Command).  However the other USAAF support commands (Air Technical Service Command (ATSC); Air Transport Command (ATC) or Troop Carrier Command) commanded a significant number of airfields in a support roles.

It is still possible to find remnants of these wartime airfields. Many were converted into municipal airports, some were returned to agriculture and several were retained as United States Air Force installations and were front-line bases during the Cold War. Hundreds of the temporary buildings that were used survive today, and are being used for other purposes.

Major Airfields 
Air Transport Command
 Fort Dix Army Airbase, Fort Dix
 95th Army Air Force Base Unit
 Provided support for Fort Dix
 Now:  McGuire Air Force Base (1948-present) 

First Air Force
 Millville Army Airfield, Millville
 441st Army Air Force Base Unit
 Now: Millville Municipal Airport 

Air Technical Service Command
 Newark Army Airfield, Newark
 438th Army Air Force Base Unit
 Joint use USAAF/US NAVY/Civil Airport, Also provided POE(Port Of Entry) for New York Area.
 Now:  Newark Liberty International Airport 
 Linden Airport, Linden
 Aircraft manufactured by General Motors were built at the defense plant adjacent to the airfield and flown out from here.
 Now: Linden Airport

References
 Maurer, Maurer (1983). Air Force Combat Units Of World War II. Maxwell AFB, Alabama: Office of Air Force History. .
 Ravenstein, Charles A. (1984). Air Force Combat Wings Lineage and Honors Histories 1947-1977. Maxwell AFB, Alabama: Office of Air Force History. .
 Thole, Lou (1999), Forgotten Fields of America : World War II Bases and Training, Then and Now - Vol. 2.  Pictorial Histories Pub . 
 Military Airfields in World War II - New Jersey

 01
Military history of New Jersey
United States World War II army airfields
New Jersey